Phantom Canyon is the name of two canyons located in Colorado, in the Western United States.

Phantom Canyon (Pikes Peak Area), a canyon located on the Gold Belt Byway. It is formed by Eightmile Creek
Phantom Canyon (Fort Collins Area), a canyon located Northwest of Fort Collins, Colorado. It is the sole canyon in the state that does not have a road. It is formed by the Cache la Poudre River

Phantom Canyon is also the name of one (N°15) of the 20 scenes of a haunted mansion called Phantom Manor, in the Disneyland Paris park